Ayad Futayyih Khalifa al-Rawi (1942 – 18 May 2018) was an Iraqi general of the Iraqi Republican Guard, and later served as the head of the Jerusalem Army. He started his service in the Army as an officer in an armoured unit, later fighting in the Iran–Iraq War, receiving numerous medals and suffering a severe head wound whilst leading an Iraqi counterattack against an Iranian offensive. In total Rawi was awarded 27 medals during the Iran–Iraq War. He was perceived to be a staunch Saddam loyalist.

Rawi was born in Rawa in 1942, and died of a stroke in Baghdad on May 18, 2018.

Iran–Iraq War
He served as commander of the Republican Guard forces at the second battle of Al Faw, which comprised some 60% of the forces deployed.

During his interview with the Iraqi Perspectives Project, al-Rawi was named by General Hamdani as one of the few first-rate commanders. Hamdani lists one of the few reasons why Hussein Kamel's attempts to improve the quality of the Republican Guard during the Iran-Iraq War was successful was that he listened to al-Rawi.

Later career
Rawi went on to serve as Governor of both Baghdad and Ta'mim Governorates.

He later became the Chief of Staff of the Al Quds Volunteer Army; a paramilitary force created in early 2001 in response to the beginning of the Second Intifada. The force's objective was seemingly to defeat Israel and liberate Palestine and Jerusalem, and the force was declared to be composed of some 21 divisions and 7 million Iraqis, although in actuality the force was largely a propaganda stunt to show support for the Palestinians, and the force was small and ineffective.

Prior to the 2003 Invasion of Iraq Rawi was on a list of sanctioned individuals.

Invasion and aftermath
Rawi was arrested on 4 June 2003, following the U.S.-led invasion of Iraq. He was no. 30 of Central Commands Top 55 list, appearing as the seven of clubs in the Most-wanted Iraqi playing cards. Despite its claimed size, the Al Quds Army ended up playing virtually no role in the war

In 2008 Rawi received a life sentence for war crimes committed in the suppression of the 1991 uprisings in Iraq.
He died in 2018 in prison.

References

1942 births
2018 deaths
Governors of Baghdad Governorate
Governors of Kirkuk Governorate
Iraqi generals
Iraqi soldiers
Iraqi prisoners sentenced to life imprisonment
Prisoners and detainees of the United States military
Prisoners sentenced to life imprisonment by Iraq
Most-wanted Iraqi playing cards
Iraq War prisoners of war
Iraqi prisoners of war